Eddy Ratti (born 4 April 1977 in Codogno) is an Italian former cyclist.

Palmares

1999
1st Coppa Colli Briantei Internazionale
1st Freccia dei Vini
2nd Gran Premio Industrie del Marmo
2000
3rd Giro d'Oro
2002
1st Stage 2b Regio-Tour
1st Tre Valli Varesine
2003
3rd Giro della Romagna
2004
2nd Giro d'Oro
2005
1st Overall Tour de Hokkaido
1st Stages 1 & 4
2006
1st Stage 5 Settimana Ciclistica Lombarda
2nd Circuit de Lorraine
3rd Giro del Trentino
3rd Giro dell'Appennino
2008
1st Overall Istrian Spring Trophy
1st Stage 2
1st GP Industria & Artigianato di Larciano
2nd Giro dell'Appennino
3rd Overall Brixia Tour
1st Stage 2

References

1977 births
Living people
Italian male cyclists
People from Codogno
Cyclists from the Province of Lodi